Joëlle Garriaud-Maylam (born 20 March 1955) is a French politician of the Republicans (LR) who has been a member of the Senate of France since 2004.

Political career
In the Senate, Garriaud-Maylam is on the Committee on European Affairs. In addition to her committee assignments, she has been a member of the French delegation to the NATO Parliamentary Assembly since 2008.

Appointed President of NATO Parliamentary Assembly in 2022.

Personal life
Garriaud-Maylam married Anthony F. Maylam in 1985.

References

External links
Page on the Senate website
GARRIAUD-MAYLAM Joëlle on NATO PA

1955 births
Living people
French Senators of the Fifth Republic
Union for a Popular Movement politicians
Women members of the Senate (France)
21st-century French women politicians
Senators of French citizens living abroad
20th-century French women
Charles University alumni
Yale University alumni
The Republicans (France) politicians
People from Maghnia